Emanuel Sampson, nicknamed "Eddie", is an American former Negro league outfielder who played in the 1940s.

Sampson made his Negro leagues debut with the Birmingham Black Barons in 1941. He played for Birmingham again in 1946.

References

External links
 and Seamheads

Date of birth missing
Place of birth missing
Birmingham Black Barons players
Baseball outfielders